List of plant species in the genus Licania.

Species
 the World Checklist of Selected Plant Families and The Plant List recognise about 223 accepted taxa (of species and infraspecific names) in the plant genus Licania. In January 2023 Plants of the World Online (the replacement for Plant List) only accepted 103 Species.

A

 Licania affinis  
 Licania alba  

 Licania apiculata  
 Licania apiknae 
 Licania aracaensis  

 Licania areolata 
 Licania arianeae

B 

 Licania belemii  
 Licania bellingtonii  

 Licania blackii  

 Licania boyanii  
 Licania bracteata  

 Licania buxifolia

C 

 Licania caldasiana  

 Licania canescens  

 Licania cidii  
 Licania compacta  
 Licania condoriensis 

 Licania cordata  
 Licania coriacea  
 Licania corniculata  

 Licania couepiifolia  
 Licania crassivenia  
 Licania cruegeriana  
 Licania cuatrecasasii  
 Licania cuprea  

 Licania cuyabenensis  
 Licania cyathodes  
 Licania cymosa

D

 Licania davillifolia  
 Licania dealbata  
 Licania densiflora  

 Licania discolor

E

 Licania elliptica

F

 Licania fanshawei  
 Licania farinacea 

 Licania ferreirae  

 Licania foldatsii  

 Licania furfuracea

G

 
 Licania glauca  
 Licania glazioviana  
 
 Licania gracilipes

H

 Licania harlingii  
 Licania hebantha 

 Licania hitchcockii  
 Licania hoehnei  

 Licania hypoleuca

I

 Licania impressa  
 Licania incana  
 Licania indurata  

 Licania irwinii

J
 

 Licania jimenezii

K

 Licania kunthiana

L

 Licania lamentanda  
 Licania lanceolata  

 Licania laxiflora  
 Licania leptostachya  

 Licania littoralis

M

 Licania majuscula  

 Licania marleneae  
 Licania maxima  

 Licania membranacea  

 Licania micrantha  
 Licania microphylla  

 Licania minuscula  

 Licania mollis  

 Licania monteagudensis

N
 Licania naviculistipula  
 Licania nelsonii  
 Licania niloi  
 Licania nitida

O

 Licania orbicularis  
 Licania ovalifolia

P

 Licania pallida  
 Licania paraensis  
 Licania parviflora  

 Licania parvifructa  

 Licania piresii  
 Licania pittieri  

 Licania polita  

 Licania pruinosa

R

 Licania riedelii  

 Licania robusta  
 Licania rodriguesii  
 Licania roraimensis  
 Licania rufescens

S

 Licania sandwithii  
 Licania santosii  
 Licania savannarum  

 Licania silvae  

 Licania spicata  

 Licania stewardii  
 Licania steyermarkii  
 Licania stricta  

 Licania subrotundata

T

 Licania teixeirae  
 Licania tepuiensis  
 Licania ternatensis  
 Licania tocantina  

 Licania triandra  
 Licania trigonioides

U

 Licania urceolaris

V

 Licania vaupesiana  

 Licania velutina

W

References

List
Licania